Wrightstown Octagonal Schoolhouse, also known as Wrightstown Eight Square School and Penns Park Octagonal School, is a historic one-room school located at Wrightstown, Wrightstown Township, Bucks County, Pennsylvania. It was built in 1802, and is a one-story, one room, stone schoolhouse building.  It has a wood shingled pyramidal roof and small terra cotta chimney. It operated as a subscription school from its construction until 1850. It was then used as a farm outbuilding, and in the 1980s as an artist's studio.  It was restored in 1996 by the Wrightstown Township Historical Commission.

It was added to the National Register of Historic Places in 2007.
They hold an open house the third Sunday of each month from May through October. Open house hours are 1:00 pm- 5:00 pm. Admission is free.

Gallery

References

External links
 Penns Park Octagonal School House, South corner State Road 232 & Swamp Road, Wrightstown, Bucks County, PA: 4 photos, 2 data page, and 1 photo caption page at Historic American Buildings Survey

Octagonal school buildings in the United States
One-room schoolhouses in Pennsylvania
School buildings completed in 1802
Schools in Bucks County, Pennsylvania
School buildings on the National Register of Historic Places in Pennsylvania
National Register of Historic Places in Bucks County, Pennsylvania